The Council of Philippopolis in 343, 344, or 347 was a result of Arian bishops from the Eastern Roman Empire leaving the Council of Sardica to form their own counter council. In Philippopolis, they anathemized the term homoousios, in effect excommunicating Pope Julius I as well as their rivals at the Council in Sardica, and introduced the term Anomoian and as a result, the Arian controversy was perpetuated, rather than resolved, as was the original intention of the Roman emperors Constans and Constantius  along with Pope Julius who called the Council of Sardica.

Serdica is now called Sofia, the capital of Bulgaria. Philippopolis is now called Plovdiv, Bulgaria's second largest city.

References

Bibliography
Sacred Texts, Early Church Fathers - Chapter XX Of the Council at Sardica

Philippopolis
Arianism
History of Plovdiv
344
340s in the Roman Empire